20XX: We Are (stylized as 20XX "We are") is the fourteenth studio album released by the Japanese hip-hop group w-inds, released on November 24, 2021. It reached No. 18 on the Oricon charts.

The album included their physical singles "Get Down" and "DoU", as well as their digital singles "Beautiful Now", "Strip" and "Little." 

20XX "We Are" was released in three separate editions: a CD only edition, CD+DVD and CD+Blu-ray edition. The two latter editions housed the music video for "Strip" and the making of the album.

Information
20XX "We Are" is a studio album released by w-inds, released three years after their previous album 100, and first album with the new two-member group. The album debuted at No. 4 on the Oricon Albums Charts and took the No. 18 spot for the first week. It remained on the charts for two consecutive weeks.

The album was released in five editions: a standard CD containing ten musical tracks; a CD+DVD/Blu-ray edition, both which housed the music video for "Strip" and a documentary for the album; and a limited 2CD+DVD/Blu-ray+Photobook, which carried 20XX The Best Instrumental on the second disc. With the exception of the CD only, all editions were given a limited release that contained a making of the albums' covers. The CD included their singles Get Down and DoU. Also included were their digital singles "Beautiful Now," "Strip," and "Little," and their collaboration with fellow label-mates Da Pump and Lead for "The Christmas Song." 

All of the songs were produced by lead vocalist Keita Tachibana.

Promotional activities
Prior to the album's release, the group released five singles, two which were physical and three that were digital. 

Get Down was the forty-first single released by w-inds, and was their first and only of 2019, released on July 31. It took No. 16 on the Oricon Singles Charts for the first week and remained on the charts for eight weeks. It was released in two formats, a CD only and a limited CD+DVD edition. The CD contained the title track and the coupling tracks "Take it Slow" and "Femme Fatale," while the limited CD+DVD omitted "Femme Fatale" on the CD, but carried the music video and making video for "Get Down."

DoU was their forty-second single and was released on January 22, 2020, becoming their first single of 2020. It took No. 25 on Oricon for its first week and remained on the charts for three weeks. Like their previous single, it was released in CD only and a limited CD+DVD edition. The CD contained the title track and the coupling tracks "Candy" and "We Don’t Need To Talk Anymore Remix feat. SKY-HI." The DVD housed the music video for "DoU," along with the making video.

"Beautiful Now" was their first digital single for the album, released on December 2, 2020. It was their first song released since Ryuichi Ogata's departure in June of that year. On December 4, a music video for the song was released on w-inds' official YouTube. Their second digital single, "Strip", was released on September 24, 2021. A music video accompanied the song's release on the group's official YouTube on the same day. "Little" was their final digital single for the album, released on October 22, 2021. To aid in promotion, an official lyric video was released on their official YouTube the day before on October 21.

The group collaborated with fellow label-mates Da Pump and Lead for track 7, "The Christmas Song." The music video was released on the group's official YouTube the day after the album's release on November 25.

Track listing
All songs produced by Keita Tachibana

Charts

References

External links
w-inds Official Site

2021 compilation albums
2021 albums
Pony Canyon albums